The 1938 Spring Hill Badgers football team was an American football team that represented Spring Hill College as a member of the Dixie Conference during the 1938 college football season. In their first year under head coach Earle Smith, the team compiled a 3–6 record.

Schedule

References

Spring Hill
Spring Hill Badgers football seasons
Spring Hill Badgers football